Duchess of Manchester is a title given to the wife of the Duke of Manchester. Women who have held the title include:

Isabella Montagu, Duchess of Manchester (–1786)
Elizabeth Montagu, Duchess of Manchester (–1832)
Louisa Cavendish, Duchess of Devonshire (1832–1911), formerly Duchess of Manchester
Consuelo Montagu, Duchess of Manchester (1853–1909)
Helena, Countess of Kintore (1878–1971), formerly Duchess of Manchester